Cho Sung-hwan (born 25 March 1985) is a South Korean footballer who plays for Woodlands Wellington in the S.League.

Club career

A graduate of the University of Suwon, Cho began his professional career with Korea National League side Ansan Hallelujah in 2009. He would eventually spend two seasons with the Eagles before transferring to Challengers League side FC Pocheon, winning a champions medal with them in 2012.

Cho travelled to Singapore after the 2012 Challengers League concluded and went on trial with S.League side, Woodlands Wellington.

After impressing the coaching panel in Woodlands' pre-season friendlies against Albirex Niigata (S), Home United and Tampines Rovers, the Rams announced that Cho had been confirmed as the fifth foreigner for the 2013 season alongside Moon Soon-Ho, Atsushi Shimono, Jang Jo-Yoon and Khalid Hamdaoui.

He made his debut for Woodlands Wellington on 21 February 2013 in a 2–2 draw against Warriors F.C.

Club career statistics 

All numbers encased in brackets signify substitute appearances.

References

External links
Cho Sung-hwan at n-league.net

1985 births
Living people
South Korean footballers
South Korean expatriate footballers
Goyang Zaicro FC players
Woodlands Wellington FC players
Korea National League players
K3 League players
Expatriate footballers in Singapore
South Korean expatriate sportspeople in Singapore
Singapore Premier League players
Association football midfielders